Hernán Darío Herrera Ramírez (born 28 October 1957) is a Colombian football manager and former player who played as a midfielder. He is currently in charge of Atlético Nacional's youth categories. Herrera made eight appearances for the Colombia national team from 1979 to 1985. He was also part of Colombia's squad for the 1979 Copa América tournament.

References

External links
 

1957 births
Living people
Colombian footballers
Association football midfielders
Colombia international footballers
Atlético Nacional footballers
América de Cali footballers
Colombian football managers
Deportivo Pasto managers
Atlético Nacional managers
Sportspeople from Antioquia Department